Thomas Gardnor (c. 1685–1775) was a City of London upholsterer who was a property owner in Hampstead, London, and the owner of Gardnor House, Hampstead. With his wife and his heirs he was responsible for the development of several streets in the town.

Early life
Thomas Gardnor was born around 1685.

Hampstead

Thomas Gardnor was a successful upholsterer in the City of London who with his wife was an important property owner in Hampstead, London. In 1749, he bought the house now known as Gardnor House in Flask Walk (built c. 1736). The Gardnors and their descendants gradually enlarged their property holdings in the area to include Flask Walk, Streatley Place and parts of Heath Street, High Street and New End. The family also owned houses in Church Row on the site of Gardnor Mansions. Gardnor House is listed Grade II* on the National Heritage List for England. 

Gardnor was a trustee of the Hampstead mineral waters.

Death
Gardnor died in 1775. He is buried at St John-at-Hampstead churchyard in a family grave. The tomb is grade II listed and is the only tomb in the cemetery to mention a smallpox death. His Will is available from the British National Archives.

Legacy
Gardnor Road in Hampstead was built in the gardens of Gardnor House in 1871/72 or the 1880s after the death of the last Thomas Gardnor in 1863.

References 

1680s births
1775 deaths
Date of birth unknown
Year of birth uncertain
People from Hampstead
British real estate businesspeople
Upholsterers